Diana, The Rose Conspiracy  is a 2005 short film  directed  by Uruguayan media artist Martin Sastre. It depicts a day when the world discovers that Diana, Princess of Wales, did not die in Paris and has a new undercover life in a dangerous cantegril on the outskirts of Montevideo, Uruguay. The film was shot in a real Uruguayan slum along with other parts of Montevideo. It stars a Diana impersonator, an English teacher from Sao Paulo named Denise Watson. It was selected as one of the best works by the Italian Art Critics Association at the Venice Biennale. After the first public screening the film provoked false media headlines about Diana being alive in Uruguay. This film can only be seen in museums such as the Solomon R. Guggenheim Museum in New York City, private collections and other art spaces.

References

2005 films
2005 short films
Films about Diana, Princess of Wales
English-language Uruguayan films
2005 drama films
Films set in Montevideo
Uruguayan drama films